Gerald Vernon-Jackson CBE (born 10 January 1962) is a Liberal Democrat politician in Portsmouth, England. He has been the leader of Portsmouth City Council since 15 May 2018, having previously been leader between 2004–2014, and councillor for Milton Ward since 2003.

Personal life
Vernon-Jackson was born in Hampshire, England. He is the son of Jean Vernon-Jackson MBE, former Chairman of Hampshire County Council and New Forest District Council, and a graduate of the University of Liverpool and University of Southampton with a bachelor's degree in History and a Master's in Social Care, respectively.

Political career
Vernon-Jackson was an elected member of the Newbury Council from 1995 to 2003, where he served as Deputy Leader of the Liberal Democrats group. During this period, he served as Head of Office for Newbury MP David Rendel, and the Deputy Director of Campaigns of the Liberal Democrats. He would also contest the European Parliament Election, 1999 as 8th member of the Liberal Democrats list for the South East England constituency, ahead of future MEP Catherine Bearder. In 2003 he was elected to Milton Ward and assumed the Deputy Leadership of the Portsmouth Liberal Democrats Group. In 2004 he became Leader of the Council, a position he held until the 2014 council election. During this period, the Liberal Democrat administration was accused of covering up an independent report into allegations of sexual harassment made against then-MP Mike Hancock, Vernon-Jackson himself having dismissed the accusations as being motivated by possible financial gain.

Following a spell in opposition, after the 2018 council election, Vernon-Jackson reassumed Leadership of the Council in a minority administration with the support of the Labour Party council group. Since reassuming leadership, Vernon-Jackon's second administration caused controversy due to its decision to pursue the closure of Victory Energy, pursued the development of Tipner West, sought and received approval for the development of the Horsea Island Country Park and took charge of Council preparations for Brexit. In a letter to Michael Gove, minister in charge of no-deal Brexit planning, Vernon-Jackson accused the Government of underestimating the potential strife caused by a no-deal Brexit to Portsmouth docks.

During his time in opposition, Vernon-Jackson ran for the Portsmouth South constituency, first in 2015 to succeed Mike Hancock, and then again in 2017 in an attempt to retake the constituency for the Liberal Democrats, however was defeated in both attempts by Flick Drummond and Stephen Morgan, respectively. He stood again in Portsmouth South at the 2019 election, initially placed first in constituency polling against Labour and the Conservative candidates in a poll commissioned by the Liberal Democrats, however successive polling commissioned by the Liberal Democrats for the constituency would see Vernon-Jackson slip into third place, where he would ultimately poll on election day. In 2016, Vernon-Jackson was awarded a CBE for his services to local government.

From 2012 to 2017, Vernon-Jackson served as Vice Chair & Lib Dem Group Leader on the Local Government Association. Since January 2020, Vernon-Jackson has been a member of the Liberal Democrats Federal Board, and he was Chair of the English Liberal Democrats from February 2020 to December 2020.

References

1962 births
Living people
Alumni of the University of Liverpool
Alumni of the University of Southampton
Commanders of the Order of the British Empire
English LGBT politicians
Gay politicians
Liberal Democrats (UK) councillors
Councillors in Hampshire
Politicians from Portsmouth
Leaders of local authorities of England
People educated at Walhampton School and Hordle House School